Frogmore Mound Site (16 CO 9) is an archaeological site of the Late Coles Creek culture in Concordia Parish, Louisiana. It was added to the National Register of Historic Places on July 28, 2004.

Description
This structure was burned and subsequently covered with dirt. A mound, constructed in two stages very near each other chronologically, was built over top of the structure.

Excavations at the site have produced charcoal from beneath the mound that dates to 1020–1260 CE. Pottery recovered from the midden places the occupation of the site to the Late Coles Creek period.

Frogmore archeological site
As stated in NRHP registration form:

See also
Culture, phase, and chronological table for the Mississippi Valley
DePrato Mounds
Frogmore Plantation
Piazza Cotton Gin, also located in Frogmore Plantation
National Register of Historic Places listings in Concordia Parish, Louisiana

References

External links

 Louisiana Life Magazine:Mounds of Mystery
 Historical Marker Database: Ancient Mounds Trail - Frogmore Mound

Archaeological sites of the Coles Creek culture
Mounds in Louisiana
Geography of Concordia Parish, Louisiana
Archaeological sites on the National Register of Historic Places in Louisiana
National Register of Historic Places in Concordia Parish, Louisiana